Proposition 126 (also known as the Alcohol Delivery Service Initiative) is a citizen-initiated, statewide ballot measure that was rejected in Colorado on November 8th, 2022.  The measure would have allowed alcohol retailers and liquor licensed businesses to offer alcohol delivery through third-party delivery services.

Contents 
The amendment appeared on the ballot as follows:

Overview
Proposition 126 would:
authorize grocery stores, convenience stores, liquor stores, bars, and restaurants to sell and deliver alcohol through third-party services, such as grocery and meal delivery companies, effective March 1st, 2023
remove restrictions limiting the amount of revenue a store can make through alcohol delivery
permanently allow bars and restaurants to offer alcohol takeout and delivery (temporarily authorized in 2020, set to automatically repeal on July 1, 2025)

Background
Alcohol delivery has been allowed by liquor stores since 1994, by wineries since 1997, and by grocery and convenience stores since 2019.  Currently, retailers are allowed to deliver alcohol using a store-owned vehicle by a store employee who is at least 21 years old.

Support
Proposition 126 is supported by the Colorado Chamber of Commerce, the Colorado Restaurant Association, the Hispanic Restaurant Association, The Denver Post, the NAACP Rocky Mountain State Area Conference, the Aurora Chamber of Commerce, the Grand Junction Chamber of Commerce, the Wine in Grocery Stores Initiative, and Fair Delivery for All Small Businesses.

Opposition
Proposition 126 is opposed by the Colorado Licensed Beverage Association and Keeping Colorado Local.

References

Colorado ballot measures
2022 Colorado elections